Stade Pierre Pibarot is a stadium in Alès, France.  It is currently used for football matches and is the home stadium of Olympique Alès.  The stadium holds 12,000 spectators.  It is named after Pierre Pibarot.

External links
 Stadium information

Pierre Pibarot
Olympique Alès
Sports venues in Gard